Whites is a settlement in Lejweleputswa District Municipality in the Free State province of South Africa.

Located near Hennenman, the settlement was the site of a cement factory of the Whites South Africa Cement Company dating back to 1913. The company is now owned by Lafarge as part of its South African division.

References

Populated places in the Matjhabeng Local Municipality